Roman Romkowski born Nasiek (Natan) Grinszpan-Kikiel, (February 16, 1907 – July 12, 1965) was a Polish communist official trained by Comintern in Moscow. After the Soviet takeover of Poland Romkowski settled in Warsaw and became second in command (the deputy minister) in the Ministry of Public Security (MBP or colloquially UB) during the late 1940s and early 1950s. Along with several other high functionaries including Stanisław Radkiewicz, Anatol Fejgin, Józef Różański, Julia Brystiger and the chief supervisor of Polish State Security Services, Minister Jakub Berman from the Politburo, Romkowski came to symbolize communist terror in postwar Poland.

Early life

Work in security services

Arrest 
Romkowski was arrested on April 23, 1956, during the socialist Polish October revolution, and brought to trial along with functionaries responsible for gross violations of human rights law and their abuse of power. Historian Heather Laskey alleges that it was probably not a coincidence that the high ranking Stalinist security officers put on trial by Gomułka were  Władysław Gomułka was captured by Światło and imprisoned by Romkowski in 1951 on Soviet orders, and interrogated by both, him and Fejgin. Gomułka escaped physical torture only as a close associate of Joseph Stalin, and was released three years later.

The court proceedings
At trial, Col. Różański didn't deny that he routinely tortured prisoners including Polish United Workers' Party members, and he didn't apologize for his actions. Instead, he pointed a finger at Romkowski and continuously repeated the Leninist argument that "the end justifies the means". For him, torturing people was a daily double-shift job, nothing more, nothing less. He admitted that all charges against his victims were falsified on site by his department.

Roman Romkowski had been put on trial along with Józef Różański and a second Jewish defendant from his department, Anatol Fejgin. Romkowski insisted that Różański should have been removed already in 1949 for his destructive activities, even though, Romkowski himself taught Różański everything about torture. Both, Romkowski and Różański, were sentenced to 15 years in prison on 11 November 1957, for unlawful imprisonment and mistreatment of innocent detainees. Feign was sentenced to 12 years, on similar charges.

A well-known writer Kazimierz Moczarski from AK, interrogated by Romkowski's subordinates from January 9, 1949 till June 6, 1951, described 49 different types of torture he endured. Beatings included truncheon blows to bridge of nose, salivary glands, chin, shoulder blades, bare feet and toes (particularly painful), heels (ten blows each foot, several times a day), cigarette burns on lips and eyelids and burning of fingers. Sleep deprivation, resulting in near-madness – meant standing upright in a narrow cell for seven to nine days with frequent blows to the face – a hallucinatory method called by the interrogators "Zakopane". General Romkowski told him on November 30, 1948, that he personally requested this "sheer hell".

The court announced that the actions of Roman Romkowski and his Ministry demoralised the Party as much as its own functionaries. Jakub Berman, the chief supervisor of State Security Services incriminated by Józef Światło who defected to the West, resigned from his Politburo post in May and was evaluated by the 20th Congress, which launched a process of partial democratisation of Polish political as well as economic life. The number of security agents at the ministry was cut by 22%, and 9,000 socialist and populist politicians were released from prison on top of some 34,644 detainees across the country. "The routing of the Polish Stalinists was indeed complete."

See also
 History of Polish intelligence services

Notes and references

1907 births
1965 deaths
Politicians from Moscow
Jewish Polish politicians
Jewish socialists
Communist Party of Poland politicians
Polish Workers' Party politicians
Polish United Workers' Party members
Polish intelligence officers (1943–1990)